Bideford Association Football Club is a football club based in Bideford, Devon, England. The club are nicknamed "The Robins" due to their all-red strip.

History
Bideford Town was established in the late 1890s and spent most of their history playing in the North Devon League. In 1947 the club was reformed as Bideford A.F.C., and joined Section A of the North Devon League. Although they finished bottom of the division, they remained in Section A for the 1948–49 season, which saw them finish sixth. At the end of the season they joined Division Three of the Western League, which they won at the first attempt, winning 19 of their 20 matches and drawing the other to earn promotion to Division Two. In 1951–52 they won Division Two, and were promoted to Division One.

The league was reduced to a single division in 1960, and after finishing as runners-up in 1962–63, they won the league the following season. In 1964–65 the club reached the first round of the FA Cup for the first time. They drew 3–3 with Third Division Colchester United at Layer Road before losing the replay 2–1. They went on to win back-to-back championships in 1970–71 and 1971–72, also winning the League Cup during 1971–72, and moved up to Division One South of the Southern League in 1972. In 1973–74 they reached the first round of the FA Cup again following four replays with Falmouth Town in the third qualifying round and three replays against Trowbridge Town in the fourth. Drawn at home to Third Division Bristol Rovers, they lost 2–0.

After three seasons in the Southern League they dropped back down to the Western League. When the Western League gained a second division in 1976 Bideford were placed in the Premier Division. They finished as runners-up twice in a row in 1977–78 and 1978–79, also reaching the FA Cup first round in 1977–78, losing 3–1 at Portsmouth. They won the Western League again in 1981–82, as well as reaching the first round of the FA Cup, losing 2–1 at home to Barking. The following season saw them retain the league title, and they won the League Cup for the second time in 1984–85.

Bideford dominated the Western League in the 2000s, winning the Premier Division in 2001–02, 2003–04, 2004–05, 2005–06 and 2009–10, as well as the League Cup in 2001–02 and 2003–04. After continuously opting not to take promotion due to the increased travelling costs, in 2010 they were promoted to Division One South & West of the Southern League, which they went on to win in 2011–12, earning promotion to the Premier Division. After finishing second-from-bottom of the division in 2015–16 they were relegated back to Division One South & West.

Season-by-season record

Reserve team
Bideford reserves were founder members of the South Western League in 1951 and played in the league until 1957. They joined the North Devon League in 2008. In 2015 they started playing under the name Bideford Community. The club also had an 'A' team, which played in the North Devon League from 1996 until 2002.

Ground

Bideford play their games at the Sports Ground on Kingsley Road. It has a capacity of 6,000, of which 375 is seated and 1,000 covered.

Club officials
President: Jimmy McElwee
Chairman: Kevin Tyrrell
First team manager: Sean Joyce
Assistant manager: Ben Wood
Physiotherapist: Tony Beal
Kit man: Roger Beal
Reserve team manager: Adam Northmore
Ladies team manager: Roger Bonaparte

Honours
Southern League
Division One South & West champions 2011–12
Western League
Champions 1963–64, 1970–71, 1971–72, 1981–82, 1982–83, 2001–02, 2003–04, 2004–05, 2005–06, 2009–10
Division Two champions 1951–52
Division Three champions 1949–50
League Cup winners 1971–72, 1984–85, 2001–02, 2003–04
Alan Young Cup winners 1964–65, 1969–70
Devon St Lukes Bowl
Winners 1981–82, 1983–84, 1985–86, 1995–96, 2009–10, 2021–22
Devon Professional Cup
Winners 1960–61, 1961–62, 1963–64, 1965–66, 1966–67, 1968–69, 1970–71, 1973–74, 1975–76

Records
Highest league position: 8th in the Southern League Premier Division, 2013–14
Best FA Cup performance: First round, 1964–65, 1973–74, 1977–78, 1981–82
Best FA Trophy performance: Second round, 1969–70
Best FA Vase performance: Semi-finals, 2003–04
Biggest victory: 16–1 vs Soundwell, 1950–51
Biggest away victory: 10–0 vs Melksham, 2003–04
Heaviest defeat: 1–10 vs Taunton Town, 1998–99
Most appearances: Derek May, 647
Most goals: Tommy Robinson, 259
Record attendance: 5,975 vs Gloucester City, FA Cup, 1949

See also
Bideford A.F.C. players
Bideford A.F.C. managers

References

External links
Official website

 
Football clubs in England
Football clubs in Devon
Association football clubs established in 1947
1947 establishments in England
Bideford
North Devon Football League
Western Football League
Southern Football League clubs